The Morse Message was a series of brief radio messages in Morse code that were transmitted from the Evpatoria Planetary Radar (EPR) complex and directed to the planet Venus in 1962.

The message consisted of three words, all encoded in Morse code: the word “Mir” (meaning both “peace” and “world”) was transmitted from the EPR on November 19, 1962, and the words “Lenin” and “USSR” (the abbreviation for the Soviet Union — , Soyúz Soviétskikh Sotsialistícheskikh Respúblik) were transmitted on November 24, 1962. In Russian, the Morse Message is referred to as the Radio Message “MIR, LENIN, USSR”.

The message was the first radio broadcast intended for extraterrestrial civilizations in the history of mankind. It was also used to test the radar station (though not for measuring the distance to Venus, since the EPR relied on a different technology, a coherent waveform with frequency manipulation, for distance measurements). The signals reflected off the surface of Venus and were received back on Earth 4 minutes, 32.7 seconds and 4 minutes, 44.7 seconds later (for the November 19 and November 24 broadcasts, respectively).

The signals are currently in transit to the star HD 131336 in the Libra constellation. The famous star Gliese 581, the addressee of the modern interstellar messages A Message From Earth and Hello From Earth, is also located in Libra.

See also
List of interstellar radio messages

References

1962 in the Soviet Union
Interstellar messages
Science and technology in the Soviet Union
Space program of the Soviet Union
Venus